The Kita and Minami Fortresses (Japanese kita, "north" and minami, "south") were defensive structures of the Imperial Japanese Army and Imperial Japanese Navy in the Kuril Archipelago.

The most northerly points were on the Kokutan and Kurabu Zaki capes, and its coastal front on the Shumushu Strait near Lopatka Cape in the Soviet Union's Kamchatka peninsula.

This military organization was under the Twenty-Seventh Army (Chishima Area Base Unit or Kuril Area Army), led by Shozo Terakura. The Twenty-seventh Army was under the leadership of the Fifth Area Army, under the command of Kiichiro Higuchi whose headquarters was in Sapporo, Hokkaidō. The Twenty-Seventh Army was composed of the 42nd and 91st Divisions.

Kurile fortresses 

These defensive structures in the Kurile Islands were somewhat similar to the Karafuto fortifications. The key Japanese position was on Shumushu Island, whose defense consisted of permanent emplacements protected by field and AA artillery. A garrison of over 8,000 men reinforced by 60 tanks defended the islands of Shumushu and Paramushiro. All the coastal sections convenient for landings were covered with permanent emplacements and bunkers, interconnected with underground passages and trenches. All the warehouses, power stations and hospitals were underground, up to 50 m deep.

There are also some similar military buildings in other islands in the Northern Kuriles  (Shimushiro, Onnekotan, Uruppu, Matsuwa) and Southern Kuriles (Etorofu, Kunashiri, Shikotan and Habomai archipelago).

Kita Chishima Fortress

Shumushu Island

Shumushu fortification system 

There were nine fortified installations and 20 coastal defence positions commanded from Kataoka Fortress.

Japanese Army units 
91st division
 73rd Infantry Brigade (part of 91st division under command of Maj. Gen. Iwao Zugino)
 282nd Battalion
 283rd Battalion
 284th Battalion
 285th Battalion
 286th Battalion
 287th Battalion
 11th armored regiment - Commanded by Colonel Zueo Ikeda, the regiment was equipped with 20 Type 97 Shinhoto Chi-Ha tanks, 19 Type 97 Chi-Ha medium tanks, and 25 Type 95 Ha-Go light tanks.
2. Independent armored company
 1st Artillery Unit
 2nd Artillery Unit
 I/54th Air Regiment (4 Nakajima Ki-43 Hayabusa "Oscar", some Nakajima Ki-44 Shoki "Tojo" and possibly Nakajima Ki-84 Hayate "Frank"), based in Miyoshino Airfield, Shumushu.
Shumushu Alert Radar: located at Minami Cape and cannery on the Naka River

Paramushiro Island

Paramushiro fortification system

There are less than two or possibly more fortifications and 6 or more coastal defensive positions commanded from Kashibawara Fortress.

Japanese Army units 

 91st Division HQ (Lt. Gen. Tsutsumi Fusaki)
 74th Infantry Brigade (Major Zeiji Zato)
 4th Tank Company (detachment of 11th Tank Regiment)
 II/54th Sentai (Ki-43 Oscars and Ki-44 Tojos)
Kitanodai Airfield: airfield located on the north-east tip of the island with a single 4,000' x 180° runway. The base had 40 revetments and over 50 hardstands.
Kashiwabara Airfield: located at the north-eastern tip of the island, closest to Shumshu Island. Japanese Army Staging area in the north.heavily defended by 20 anti-aircraft positions
Kakumabetsu Airfield: airfield located in the south-west side of the island with a 3,800' x 150' runway. Ki-44 Tojo operated from this strip.
Suribachi Airbase: annex airfield located at the center of the south coast of the island, with two runways.

Japanese Navy units on Shumushu and Paramushiro 

 51st Guard Unit (942 men)
 52nd Guard Unit (333 men)
 Shumushu Signal Unit (42 men)
 32nd AA Defense Unit (18 men)
 Kita Chishima Naval HQ
 North East Fleet (Kashibawara and Kataoka Bases)
 North East Unit (189 men/4 Nakajima B5N2 "Kate" and probably Aichi D3A2 "Val" or Yokosuka D4Y2 "Judy" dive bombers)
 12th Air Fleet Unit (equipped with Kawanishi H6K2 "Mavis" and Mitsubishi G4M2 "Betty")
 Shimushu Detachment, Naval Air Group 203 (with Mitsubishi A6M5 "Zeke" and Nakajima J1N1-S "Irving" night fighter)
Hokuto Kōkūtai (553rd Kōkūtai) - B5N Kate & B6N Jill
203rd Kōkūtai (A6M, J1N1)
Musashi Naval Base (Musashi Airfield): Located on the south-western tip of Paramushiro island was this naval base and airfield located at Karabu Zaki. The runways were 4,300' x 260' and 4,200' x 375'. Anti-aircraft guns were added at the nearby cape with 8 guns, 20 pillboxes and many gun pits.
Miyoshino Airfield Japanese Army-Navy airfield, located near the center of the Shumushu island. This airfield based several units including a B5N2 Kate, G3M Nell and Ki-43 Oscar based there.
Kataoka Naval Base (Imaizaki Airfield):This base had two runways 5,000' x 250' and 4,000' x 250'. The base had a large 130' x 165' hangar with 13 covered revetments and 34 uncovered revetments, three 60' oil storage tanks, and other barracks and supply buildings. The base also had a seaplane facility on the harbor, allowing H6K2 Mavis flying boats to operate at the base as headquarters of the 5th Fleet.

Such units were sometimes reinforced by seaplane tender Kimikawa Maru (with the 452nd Air Fleet aboard, equipped with Nakajima A6M2-N "Rufe" Hydro fighters).

There was also a Japanese air early warning radar of unspecified type on the southern cape of Paramushiro, Kurabu Zaki, but its view of Shumushu was likely blocked by the 5958-foot volcano (apparently named Suribachi, like the one on Iwo Jima) in the center of Paramushiro.

Shimushiro Island

Shimushiro fortification system
There are less than 2 or possibly more fortifications and 6 or more coastal defensive positions commanded from Itarkioi and Ketoebone Fortresses.

Japanese Army units 

 42nd Division (Itarkioi and Ketoebone detachments) at Simushir island.

Matsuwa Island 

 41st Independent Mixed Regiment (Colonel Ueda)
 6th Independent Tank Company
 Matsuwa Army Field Battalion
 Matsuwa Air Intelligence Unit
 102nd Hikōtai, 553rd Kōkūtai (air naval unit equipped D3A2 type 99 model 22)
 Possible east-west airstrip on southern area of island, upwards of 1.33 km maximum length

Uruppu Island 

6000 troops were based on Uruppu, including:

 129th Independent Mixed Brigade (Maj. Niho)
 53rd Anchorange Unit
 6th Disembarkation Unit (800 men)
 80th Airfield Battalion
 Uruppu Air Intelligence Unit (800 men)
 5th Independent Tank Company
 23rd Independent AA Gun Company

Other North Kuriles units 

Some units possibly existed in Shashukotan (Ootome Base) and Onnekotan (Torushiri Base).

Minami Chishima Fortress

Etorofu Island

Etorofu fortification system 

Defensive organization commanded from Rubetsu Fortress, was divided into:

Etorofu District:

 Shibetoro County
 Shibetoro Fortress
 Shana County
 Shana Fortress
 Bettobu Fortress
 Rubetsu or Etorofu County
 Toshimoe Fortress
 Rubetsu Fortress
 Tennel Fortress
 Naibo Fortress
 Riyaushi Fortress
 Tanemoe Fortress

Japanese Army units 

 89th Division
 3rd Mixed Brigade
 15th Independent Mortar Battalion
 6th Independent Machine Gun Battalion
 67th Independent Field Machine Cannon Company
 23rd Independent Field AA Gun Company
 13th Independent Antitank Gun Company
 6th Shipping Engineer Regiment
 Etorofu Air Intelligence Unit
 3rd Attack Air Combat regiment (equipped with Ki-48-Ib and Ki-48-IIa Bombers)
 Hokushintai Sentai (Army Anti Submarine Warfare Squadron) (equipped with Ki-45-Tei is KMX-MAD (Magnetic Anomaly Detector))based in Tenneru Army Airfield, Etorofu Island.

Shikotan Island 

 4th Mixed Brigade (part of 89th division)
 23rd Independent Machine Gun Battalion
 1st Mortar Company/15th Independent Mortar Battalion

Kunashiri Island 

 421st Battalion (part of 4th Mixed Brigade belonging to 89th division)
 23rd Special Guards Company

Other South Kuril units 

There were probably other detached units in Habomai Archipelago (Kaigara Group, Suisho, Akiyuri, Yuri, Shibotsu and Taraku island).

References

Kuril Islands
Military history of Japan